Pratap. P. Nair born in Thiruvananthapuram the capital city of Kerala, Pratap is a cinematographer based in Kerala. Pratap attended Film and Television Institute of India, Pune and graduated in the year 2004. After graduating from FTII, Pratap moved to Mumbai to pursue a career in cinematography. He is best known for films like Mundrothuruth, August Club and Reti. He worked in film production jobs in Mumbai, Hyderabad and Chennai, including associate cameraman, Camera Assistant and Camera Operator.
A few among his various other achievements and recognition's are National award, non feature section in the year 2002, UGC national award for best documentary direction in 2005, film critics award (television) 2012. Pratap has worked as Director of Photography for six Malayalam films and five Marathi films. Pratap has to his credit, more than fifty documentaries, short films and tv commercials and continues to work as a Director of Photography splitting his time between Mumbai, Kolkata and Trivandrum.

Filmography

Feature films

Short films

Awards
 Kerala State Film Award for Best Cinematography for Idam and Kenjira in the year 2019.

References

External links
 

Living people
Artists from Thiruvananthapuram
Malayalam film cinematographers
Film and Television Institute of India alumni
Cinematographers from Kerala
21st-century Indian photographers
Year of birth missing (living people)